Annur taluk is a taluk in Coimbatore district, Tamil Nadu, India, associated with the town of Annur. It was carved out of the Coimbatore-North taluk in 2012.

References

Taluks of Coimbatore district